Nagatomyia is a genus of horse flies in the family Tabanidae.

Distribution
Japan.

Species
Nagatomyia melanica Murdoch & Takahasi, 1961

References

Brachycera genera
Tabanidae
Diptera of Asia